The Low Energy Gamma-Ray Imager (LEGRI) was a payload for the first mission of the Spanish MINISAT platform, and active from 1997 to 2002. The objective of LEGRI was to demonstrate the viability of HgI2 detectors for space astronomy, providing imaging and spectroscopical capabilities in the 10-100 keV range. 
LEGRI was successfully launched on April 21, 1997, on a Pegasus XL rocket. The instrument was activated on May 19, 1997. It was active until February 2002.

The LEGRI system included the Detector Unit, Mask Unit, Power Supply, Digital Processing Unit, Star Sensor, and Ground Support Unit.

The LEGRI consortium included:
University of Valencia
University of Southampton
University of Birmingham
Rutherford Appleton Laboratory
Centro de Investigaciones Energéticas
Medioambientales y Tecnológicas (Ciemat) 
INTA

References

External links
Low Energy Gamma-Ray Imager (LEGRI) on the internet

Space telescopes
Gamma-ray telescopes
1997 in spaceflight